Iris versicolor is also commonly known as the blue flag, harlequin blueflag, larger blue flag, northern blue flag, and poison flag, plus other variations of these names, and in Britain and Ireland as purple iris.

It is a species of Iris native to North America, in the Eastern United States and Eastern Canada. It is common in sedge meadows, marshes, and along streambanks and shores. The specific epithet versicolor means "variously coloured".

It is one of the three Iris species in the Iris flower data set outlined by Ronald Fisher in his 1936 paper "The use of multiple measurements in taxonomic problems" as an example of linear discriminant analysis.

Description
It tends to form large clumps from thick, creeping rhizomes. Leaves are folded on the midribs so that they form an overlapping flat fan. The well developed blue flower has 6 petals and sepals spread out nearly flat and have two forms. The longer sepals are hairless and have a greenish-yellow blotch at their base. The inferior ovary is bluntly angled. Flowers are usually light to deep blue (purple and violet are not uncommon) and bloom during May to July. Fruit is a 3-celled, bluntly angled capsule. The large seeds can be observed floating in fall.

Chemical constituents
The species has been implicated in several poisoning cases of humans and animals who consumed the rhizomes, which have been found to contain a glycoside, iridin. The sap can cause dermatitis in susceptible individuals.

Toxicity and uses
Both the leaves and roots are poisonous, and can cause stomach and intestinal inflammation. Consuming the plant can be fatal to calves.

The iris has been used as magical plant, with people carrying the root (or rhizome) to get 'financial gain', or it was placed in cash registers to increase business.

Symbolism
The iris is the official state flower of the U.S. state of Tennessee. This designation was made in 1933 by the state legislature. Although the law does not specifically define a type of iris, it is generally accepted that the purple iris is the state flower.

The blue flag has been the provincial flower of Quebec since 1999, having replaced the Madonna lily which is not native to the province.

The Purple Iris is the official flower of Kappa Pi International Honorary Art Fraternity.

Gallery

References

External links
 USGS.gov: Wetland Plants and Plant Communities of Minnesota and Wisconsin

versicolor
Flora of Eastern Canada
Flora of the Eastern United States
Flora of the Appalachian Mountains
Flora of the Great Lakes region (North America)
Garden plants of North America
Flora of Ontario
Provincial symbols of Quebec
Plants described in 1753
Taxa named by Carl Linnaeus